NGC 308 is a star located in the constellation Cetus. It is only 55" away from NGC 307. It was recorded on December 31, 1866, by Robert Ball.

References

0308
18661231
Cetus (constellation)
Stars